The Green Party of Canada fielded 68 candidates in the 1988 Canadian federal election, none of whom were elected.  Some of the party's candidates have their own biography pages; information about others may be found here.

List of candidates (incomplete)

Quebec

References

 
Green Party of Canada candidates in Canadian Federal elections
candidates in the 1988 Canadian federal election